Tianhuang Emperor may refer to.

 Tianhuang Emperor (Confucianism): i.e. the supreme god Shangdi in Religious Confucianism.
 Tianhuang Emperor (Taoism): one of the Daoism's "Four heavenly ministers", corresponding to the Tianhuang Emperor constellation
 Tianhuang Emperor (constellation)：One of the Ancient China's constellations, located in the Purple Forbidden enclosure, is one of the symbols of the Emperor.
 Tianhuang Emperor (star)
 Emperor Gaozong of Tang: an emperor of the Tang dynasty
 Liu Yan: Founder of the Southern Han dynasty of the Five Dynasties and Ten Kingdoms period